Thomas B. Allen could refer to: 

Thomas B. Allen (author) (born 1929), author and historian
Thomas B. Allen (painter) (1928–2004), illustrator

See also
Thomas Allen (disambiguation)